Michael Creed Maxey (born c. 1951) is the 11th President of Roanoke College.

Michael C. Maxey became Roanoke's eleventh president on July 1, 2007; he was unanimously elected by the board of trustees having served as Roanoke's vice president for college relations and dean of admissions and financial aid from 1992 until his selection as president. He was inducted into Omicron Delta Kappa at Roanoke in 2004. He holds undergraduate and graduate degrees from Wake Forest University.

Maxey has provided dynamic leadership highlighted by Roanoke's current campaign plan – "Roanoke Rising" – that seeks to raise $200 million to finance facilities, endowment, and special projects; the college had already secured $130 million before the campaign was publicly launched on April 13, 2013. The primary objectives of the campaign are a new athletics center and an expanded science complex. Roanoke is completing its strategic plan as well; the student body now numbers over 2,000 students, several buildings have been renovated including Roanoke's first LEED certified building (Lucas Hall on the Turbyfill Quadrangle), and a new residence hall constructed, the fifth since 2005. The residence hall is Roanoke's second LEED certified building (New Hall on the "Athletic" Quadrangle).

Mr. Maxey's most recent large project was the $35 million Cregger Center, opened in 2016.

President Maxey is well known for his wearing of bow-ties.

Personal life
Maxey is a native of Bassett, Virginia. He lives with his wife, Terri, in a residence adjacent to the Roanoke campus. President and Mrs. Maxey have grown children. President Maxey is known around campus to wear only bowties. He was listed first in the Chronicle of Higher Education for being a notable academic administrator who wears a bowtie.

See also
Roanoke College
Salem, Virginia

References

External links
 official website

1950s births
Living people
Heads of universities and colleges in the United States
Wake Forest University alumni
People from Bassett, Virginia